Winkel is a village in the Dutch province of North Holland. It is a part of the municipality of Hollands Kroon, and lies about 11 km north of Heerhugowaard.

History 
The village was first mentioned in 1289 as Winckele, and means "enclosed piece of land". Winkel developed in the Middle Ages as a peat excavation settlement. It was largely destroyed in 1519, and suffered a fire in 1649.

The Dutch Reformed church is an aisleless with needle spire in a neoclassic style. It was built 1845 as a replacement for the medieval church. The tower was rebuilt in 1867.

Winkel was home to 660 people in 1840. It was a separate municipality until 1970, when it was merged with Niedorp. In 2012, it became part of the municipality of Hollands Kroon.

Gallery

References

Former municipalities of North Holland
Populated places in North Holland
Hollands Kroon